John Edward Blake Jr. (July 3, 1947 – August 15, 2014) was an American jazz violinist from South Philadelphia, Pennsylvania, United States.  He performed most prominently as a sideman in groups led by Grover Washington Jr. (in the late 1970s) and McCoy Tyner (in the early 1980s), as well as led his own groups.

He died on August 15, 2014 from complications of multiple myeloma.

Discography

As leader
 Maiden Dance (Gramavision, 1984)
 Twinkling of an Eye (Gramavision, 1985)
 Rhythm & BLU (Gramavision, 1986)
 Adventures of the Heart (Gramavision, 1987)
 A New Beginning (Gramavision, 1988)
 Quest (Sunnyside, 1992)
 Motherless Child (Artists Recording Collective, 2010)

As sideman
With James Newton
 James Newton (Gramavision, 1983)
 Luella (Gramavision, 1984)
 The African Flower (Blue Note, 1985)

With McCoy Tyner
 Horizon (Milestone, 1980)
 La Leyenda de La Hora (Columbia, 1981)
 Dimensions (Elektra Musician, 1984)

With Grover Washington Jr.
 Live at The Bijou (Kudu, 1977)
 Reed Seed (Motown, 1978)
 Paradise (Elektra, 1979)

With others
 Muhal Richard Abrams, Colors in Thirty-Third (Black Saint, 1987)
 Catalyst, Unity (Muse, 1974)
 Catalyst, A Tear and a Smile (Muse, 1976)
 Norman Connors, You Are My Starship (Buddah, 1976)
 Will Downing, Moods (Mercury, 1995)
 Carlos Garnett, Let This Melody Ring On (Muse, 1975)
 Damon Harris, Damon (Fantasy, 1978)
 George Howard, Asphalt Gardens (Palo Alto, 1982)
 Cecil McBee, Flying Out (India Navigation, 1982)
 Carmen McRae, I'm Coming Home Again (Buddah, 1980)
 Carmen McRae, Ms. Magic (Del Rack, 1986)
 Marvin Peterson, Children of the Fire (Sunrise, 1974)
 Vanessa Rubin, I'm Glad There Is You (Novus/RCA, 1994)
 Gilberto Santa Rosa, En Vivo Desde El Carnegie Hall (Sony, 1995)
 Avery Sharpe, Legends & Mentors (JKNM, 2008)
 Archie Shepp, Attica Blues (Impulse!/ABC, 1972)
 Archie Shepp, The Cry of My People (Impulse!/ABC, 1973)
 O. C. Smith, What'cha Gonna Do (Rendezvous, 1986)
 Jamaaladeen Tacuma, Brotherzone (P-Vine, 1999)
 Steve Turre, Fire and Ice (Stash, 1988)
 Steve Turre, Right There (Antilles, 1991)
 James Blood Ulmer, Harmolodic Guitar with Strings (DIW, 1997)
 Gerald Veasley, Look Ahead (Heads Up, 1992)
 Gerald Veasley, Soul Control (Inak, 1997)
 Kazumi Watanabe, The Best Performance (Better Days, 1982)
 Paula West, Come What May (Hi Horse, 2001)
 Buster Williams, Dreams Come True (Buddah, 1980)

References

Bibliography
Richard Cook: Jazz Encyclopedia. Penguin, London, 2007,

External links
John Blake Jr. official site
Interview

1947 births
2014 deaths
American jazz violinists
American male violinists
Deaths from multiple myeloma
Musicians from Philadelphia
20th-century American violinists
Jazz musicians from Pennsylvania
20th-century American male musicians
American male jazz musicians
Gramavision Records artists
Sunnyside Records artists
Deaths from cancer in Pennsylvania
20th-century African-American musicians
21st-century African-American people